The 2016 Northeast Conference women's basketball tournament was held on March 6, 9, and 13, 2016. The 2016 Northeast Conference tournament featured the league's top eight seeds. The tourney opened on March 6 with the quarterfinals, followed by the semifinals on March 9, and the finals on March 13.

Bracket

All games will be played at the venue of the higher seed

All-tournament team
Tournament MVP in bold.

References

 
Northeast Conference women's basketball tournament
Northeast Conference women's basketball tournament